Arab Americans ( or ) are Americans of Arab ancestry. Arab Americans trace ancestry to any of the various waves of immigrants of the countries comprising the Arab World.

According to the Arab American Institute (AAI), countries of origin for Arab Americans include Algeria, Bahrain, Chad, Comoros, Djibouti, Egypt, Iraq, Jordan, Kuwait, Lebanon, Libya, Mauritania, Morocco, Oman, Qatar, Israel, Palestine, Saudi Arabia, Sudan, Syria, Somalia, Tunisia, United Arab Emirates, Western Sahara, and Yemen.

According to the 2010 U.S. census, there are 1,698,570 Arab Americans in the United States. 290,893 persons defined themselves as simply Arab, and a further 224,241 as Other Arab. Other groups on the 2010 census are listed by nation of origin, and some may or may not be Arabs, or regard themselves as Arabs. The largest subgroup is by far the Lebanese Americans, with 501,907, followed by; Egyptian Americans with 190,078, Syrian Americans with 187,331, Iraqi Americans with 105,981, Moroccan Americans with 101,211, Palestinian Americans with 85,186, and Jordanian Americans with 61,664. Approximately 1/4 of all Arab Americans claimed two ancestries. A number of these ancestries are considered undercounted, given the nature of Ottoman immigration to the US during the 19th and early 20th centuries. 

A number of indigenous non-Arab ethnic groups in Western Asia and North Africa that may have lived in regions of Arab countries and are now resident in the United States are not always classified as Arabs but some may claim an Arab identity or a dual Arab/non-Arab identity; they include Assyrians, Arameans, Jews (in particular Mizrahi Jews, some Sephardi Jews), Copts, Kurds, Iraqi Turkmens, Mandeans, Circassians, Shabaki, Armenians, Greeks, Italians, Yazidis, Persians, Kawliya/Romani, Syrian Turkmens, Somalis, Djiboutians, Berbers (especially Arab-Berbers), and Nubians.

Population

The majority of Arab Americans, around 62%, originate from the region of the Levant, which includes Syria, Lebanon, Palestine, and Jordan, although overwhelmingly from Lebanon. The remainder are made up of those from Egypt, Morocco, Algeria, Iraq, Libya, the Gulf Cooperation Council, and other Arab nations.

There are nearly 3.5 million Arab Americans in the United States according to The Arab American Institute. Arab Americans live in all 50 states and in Washington, D.C., and 94% reside in the metropolitan areas of major cities. According to the 2010 U.S. census, the city with the largest percentage of Arab Americans is Dearborn, Michigan, a southwestern suburb of Detroit, at nearly 40%. The Detroit metropolitan area is home to the largest concentration of Arab Americans (403,445), followed by the New York City Combined Statistical Area (371,233), Los Angeles (308,295), San Francisco Bay Area (250,000), Chicago (176,208), and the Washington D.C area (168,208). This information is reportedly based upon survey findings but is contradicted by information posted on the Arab American Institute website itself, which states that California as a whole only has 272,485, and Michigan as a whole only 191,607. The 2010 American Community Survey information, from the American Factfinder website, gives a figure of about 168,000 for Michigan.

Sorting by American states, according to the 2000 U.S. census, 48% of the Arab American population, 576,000, reside in California, Michigan, New York, Florida, and New Jersey, respectively; these 5 states collectively have 31% of the net U.S. population. Five other states - Illinois, Texas, Ohio, Massachusetts, and Pennsylvania - report Arab American populations of more than 40,000 each. Also, the counties which contained the greatest proportions of Arab Americans were in California, Michigan, New York, Florida, New Jersey, Ohio, Pennsylvania, and Virginia.

The cities with 100,000 or more in population with the highest percentages of Arabs are Sterling Heights, Michigan 3.69%; Jersey City, New Jersey 2.81%; Warren, Michigan 2.51%; Allentown, Pennsylvania 2.45%; Burbank, California 2.39% and nearby Glendale, California 2.07%; Livonia, Michigan 1.94%; Arlington, Virginia 1.77%; Paterson, New Jersey 1.77%; and Daly City, California 1.69%. Bayonne, New Jersey, a city of 63,000, reported an Arab-American population of 5.0% in the 2010 US Census.

Arab American ethnic groups

Arab Population by State (2010) 
The US Census Bureau calculates the number of Arab Americans based on the number of people who claimed at least one Arab ancestry as one of their two ancestries. The Arab American Institute surveys the number of people of Arab descent in the US, regardless of the number of people who claimed Arab descent in the census.

Religious background

While the majority of the population of the Arab world is Muslim, most Arab Americans, are Christian. Furthermore, the majority of Arab American Christians are Catholic.

According to the Arab American Institute based on the Zogby International Survey in 2002, the breakdown of religious affiliation among persons originating from Arab countries is as follows:
 63% Christian
 35% Catholic (Roman Rite Catholics and Eastern Catholics — Maronites and Melkites)
 18% Orthodox (Eastern Orthodox or Oriental Orthodox)
 10% Protestant
 24% Muslim
 13% Other; no affiliation

The percentage of Arab Americans who are Muslim has increased in recent years because most new Arab immigrants tend to be Muslim. In the past 10 years, most Arab immigrants were Muslim as compared to 15 to 30 years when they were mostly Christian. This stands in contrast to the first wave of Arab immigration to the United States between the late 19th and early 20th centuries when almost all immigrants were Christians. Those Palestinians often Eastern Orthodox, otherwise Roman Catholic and a few Episcopalians. A small number are Protestant adherents, either having joined a Protestant denomination after immigrating to the U.S. or being from a family that converted to Protestantism while still living in the Eastern Mediterranean (European and American Protestant missionaries were fairly commonplace in the Levant in the late 19th and early 20th centuries).

Arab Christians, especially from Lebanon, Iraq, Palestine, Jordan, Syria, and Egypt, continue to immigrate into the U.S. in the 2000s and continue to form new enclaves and communities across the country. 

The United States is the second largest home of Druze communities outside the Middle East after Venezuela (60,000). According to some estimates there are about 30,000 to 50,000 Druzes in the United States, with the largest concentration in Southern California. Most Druze immigrated to the U.S. from Lebanon and Syria.

Arab-American identity

In 2012, prompted in part by post-9/11 discrimination, the American-Arab Anti-Discrimination Committee petitioned the Department of Commerce's Minority Business Development Agency to designate the MENA populations as a minority/disadvantaged community. Following consultations with MENA organizations, the Census Bureau announced in 2014 that it would establish a new MENA ethnic category for populations from Western Asia, North Africa or the Arab world, separate from the White classification that these populations had previously sought in 1909. The expert groups, including some Jewish organizations, felt that the earlier White designation no longer accurately represents MENA identity, so they lobbied for a distinct categorization. However, this was later rejected by the government and in the 2020 census they continued to be labeled under White.

As of December 2015, the sampling strata for the new MENA category includes the Census Bureau's working classification of 19 MENA groups, as well as Sudanese, Djiboutian, Somali, Mauritanian, Armenian, Cypriot, Afghan, Iranian, Azerbaijani and Georgian groups.

The Arab American Institute and other groups have noted that there was a rise in hate crimes targeting the Arab American community as well as people perceived as Arab/Muslim after the September 11 attacks and the US-led 2003 invasion of Iraq.

A new Zogby Poll International found that there are 3.5 million Americans who were identified as "Arab-Americans", or Americans of ancestry belonging to one of the 23 UN member countries of the Arab World (these are not necessarily therefore Arabs). Poll finds that, overall, a majority of those identifying as Arab Americans are Lebanese Americans (largely as a result of being the most numerous group).
The Paterson, New Jersey-based Arab American Civic Association runs an Arabic language program in the Paterson school district. Paterson, New Jersey has been nicknamed Little Ramallah and contains a neighborhood with the same name, with an Arab American population estimated as high as 20,000 in 2015. Neighboring Clifton, New Jersey is following in Paterson's footsteps, with rapidly growing Arab, Muslim, and Palestinian American populations.

Politics
In a 2007 Zogby poll, 62% of Arab Americans vote Democratic, while only 25% vote Republican.  The percentage of Arabs voting Democratic increased sharply during the Iraq War.  However, a number of prominent Arab American politicians are Republicans, including former Oregon Governor Victor Atiyeh, former New Hampshire Senator John E. Sununu, and California Congressman Darrell Issa, who was the driving force behind the state's 2003 recall election that removed Democratic Governor Gray Davis from office.  The first woman Supreme Court Chief Justice in Florida, Rosemary Barkett, who is of Syrian descent, is known for her dedication to progressive values.

Arab Americans gave George W. Bush a majority of their votes in 2000. However, they backed John Kerry in 2004 and Barack Obama in both 2008 and 2012. They also backed Hillary Clinton in 2016 and Joe Biden in 2020.

According to a 2000 Zogby poll, 52% of Arab Americans are anti-abortion, 74% support the death penalty, 76% are in favor of stricter gun control, and 86% want to see an independent Palestinian state.

In a study, Arab Americans living in Detroit were found to have values more similar to that of the Arab world than those of the general population living in Detroit, on average, being more closely aligned to the strong traditional values and survival values. This was less the case when participants were secular or belonged to second and subsequent generations.

Non-Arab Americans from Arab countries
There are many U.S. immigrants from the Arab world who are not always classified as Arabs because through much of the Arabized world, Arabs were considered a colonizing force and many ethnic groups maintained their ethnic cultural and religious heritage, often times through syncretism. Among these are Armenian Americans, Assyrian Americans, Kurdish Americans and Jewish Americans of Mizrahi origin and Maronites. Some of these groups, such as Assyrian or Syriac ones, are Semitic language speakers, while the vast majority of the rest are not Semitic language speakers. It is very difficult to estimate the size of these communities. For example, some Armenians immigrated to the U.S. from Lebanon, Syria, or Iraq. Estimates place these communities at least in the tens of thousands. Other smaller communities include Assyrians, Berbers, Turks, Mandeans, Circassians, Shabaki,  Mhallami, Georgians, Yazidis, Balochs, Iranians, Azerbaijanis and Kawliya/Roma.

Most of these ethnic groups speak their own native languages (usually another Semitic language related to Arabic) and have their own customs, along with the Arabic dialect from the Arab country they originate from.

Arab American Heritage Month
In 2014, Montgomery County, Maryland designated April as Arab American Heritage Month in recognition of the contributions that Arab Americans have made to the nation. The first documentary on Arab Americans premiered on PBS in August 2017, The Arab Americans features the Arab American immigrant story as told through the lens of American History and the stories of prominent Arab Americans such as actor Jamie Farr, Ralph Nader, Senator George Mitchell, White House Reporter Helen Thomas, Pulitzer Prize-winning journalist Anthony Shadid, Danny Thomas actor and Founder of St. Jude Children's Research Hospital, pollster and author John Zogby, Congressman Nick Rahall, racing legend Bobby Rahal. The documentary is produced and directed by Abe Kasbo.

The United States Department of State has recognized April as the National Arab American Heritage Month, making it the highest level of federal recognition, yet. Stating in a public announcement on April 1st, 2021 through their official social media channels: "Americans of Arab heritage are very much a part of the fabric of this nation, and Arab Americans have contributed in every field and profession."

The recognition of the month of April as the National Arab American Heritage Month by the United States Department of State was mainly influenced by independent advocate efforts across the United States calling for inclusivity. Most notably the petition and social change campaign by Pierre Subeh, who is a Middle-Eastern American business expert, executive producer, and author. He orchestrated a self-funded social awareness campaign with over 250 billboards across the country asking the Federal government to recognize the month of April as the National Arab American Heritage Month and issue an official proclamation. His social change campaign called the recognition to be critical as it celebrates Middle Eastern heritage in combatting post-9/11 anti-Arab sentiments and recognizing the social difficulties that Arab Americans face every day in their communities.

Festivals
While the spectrum of Arab heritage includes 22 countries, their combined heritage is often celebrated in cultural festivals around the United States.

New York City
The Annual Arab-American & North African Street Festival was founded in 2002 by the Network of Arab-American Professionals of NY (NAAP-NY). Located in downtown Manhattan, on Great Jones Street between Lafayette & Broadway, the Festival attracts an estimated 15,000 people, in addition to over 30 Arab and North African vendors along with an all-day live cultural performance program representing performers from across the Arab world.

The New York Arab-American Comedy Festival was founded in 2003 by comedian Dean Obeidallah and comedian Maysoon Zayid. Held annually each fall, the festival showcases the talents of Arab-American actors, comics, playwrights and filmmakers, and challenges as well as inspires fellow Arab-Americans to create outstanding works of comedy. Participants include actors, directors, writers and comedians.

Seattle
Of particular note is ArabFest in Seattle, begun in 1999. The festival includes all 22 of the Arab countries, with a souk marketplace, traditional and modern music, an authentic Arab coffeehouse, an Arabic spelling bee, and a fashion show. Lectures and workshops explore the rich culture and history of the Arab peoples, one of the world's oldest civilizations. Also of new interest is the Arabic rap concert, including the NW group Sons of Hagar, showcasing the political and creative struggle of Arabic youth.

Phoenix
In 2008, the first annual Arab American Festival in Arizona was held on 1 and 2 November in Glendale, Arizona. There were more than 40,000 attendees over the two-day event; more than 35 international singers, dancers, and musicians from all over the Arab World performed 20 hours of live entertainment on stage. Activities included folklore shows, an international food court, hookah lounge, kids rides and booth vendors, open to the public, and admission was free.

California
The Annual Arab American Day Festival is a three-day cultural and entertainment event held in Orange County. Activities include book and folk art exhibitions, speeches from community leaders in the county, as well as music and poetry, dancing singing, traditional food, hookah and much more.

Wisconsin
Since 1996, Milwaukee's Arab World Fest has been part of the summer festival season. It is held on the second weekend of August. This three-day event hosts music, culture, and food celebrating the 22 Arab countries. The festival features live entertainment, belly dancing, hookah rental, camel rides, cooking demonstrations, a children's area and great Arab cuisine. It is a family-friendly festival on Milwaukee's lakefront.

Notable people

See also

 American-Arab Anti-Discrimination Committee
 Arab American Institute
 Arab American Political Action Committee
 Arab Community Center for Economic and Social Services
 Arab diaspora
 Arab immigration to the United States
 Arab lobby in the United States
 Arabs in Europe
 Diaspora politics in the United States
 History of the Middle Eastern people in Metro Detroit
 Hyphenated American
 Iraqi diaspora
 Islam in Europe
 List of American Muslims
 Refugees of Iraq

Notes

References

Further reading
 Abraham, Nabeel. "Arab Americans." in Gale Encyclopedia of Multicultural America, ed. by Thomas Riggs, (3rd ed., vol. 1, Gale, 2014), pp. 125–140. online
 Abraham, Nabeel, and Andrew Shryock, eds. Arab Detroit: From Margin to Mainstream (Wayne State UP, 2000).
 Ameri, Anan, and Holly Arida. Daily Life of Arab Americans in the 21st Century (Greenwood, 2012).
 Alsultany, Evelyn. Arabs and Muslims in the Media: Race and Representation after 9/11 (New York University Press, 2012).
 Cainkar, Louis A. Homeland insecurity: the Arab American and Muslim American experience after 9/11 (Russell Sage Foundation, 2009).
 Haddad, Yvonne Yazbeck. Becoming American?: The Forging of Arab Muslim Identity in Pluralist America (Baylor University Press, 2011).
 Köszegi, Michael A., and J. Gordon Melton, eds. Islam in North America: A Sourcebook (2 vol. 1992).
 McCarus, Ernest, ed. The Development of Arab-American Identity (U of Michigan Press, 1994).
 Naff, Alixa. Becoming American: The Early Arab Immigrant Experience (Southern Illinois University Press, 1985).
 Naber, Nadine. Arab America: Gender, Cultural Politics, and Activism (New York UP, 2012).
 Odeh, Rasmea. "Empowering Arab Immigrant Women in Chicago: The Arab Women's Committee." Journal of Middle East Women's Studies 15.1 (2019): 117–124.
 Pennock, Pamela E. The Rise of the Arab American Left: Activists, Allies, and Their Fight against Imperialism and Racism, 1960s–1980s (U of North Carolina Press, 2017). xii, 316 pp
 Shahin, Saif. "Unveiling the American-Muslim press: News agendas, frames, and functions." Journalism (2014) 16#7 884-903 https://doi.org/10.1177/1464884914545376
 Naff, Alixa. "Arabs" in Thernstrom, Stephan; Orlov, Ann; Handlin, Oscar, eds. Harvard Encyclopedia of American Ethnic Groups, Harvard University Press, pp 128–136, Online free to borrow
 Waleed, F. Mahdi. Arab Americans In Film: From Hollywood And Egyptian Stereotypes To Self-Representation (Syracuse University Press, 2020).
 Wills, Emily Regan. Arab New York: Politics and Community in the Everyday Lives of Arab Americans (NYU Press, 2019).

External links
 2000 U.S. Census Report on the Arab-American population
 Arab American Content Portal

Multiracial ethnic groups in the United States
 
Middle Eastern American
Ethnic groups in the United States